Ciorești is a commune in Nisporeni District, Moldova. It is composed of two villages—Ciorești and Vulcănești.

References

Communes of Nisporeni District